Henry Anton Homburger (December 2, 1902 – September 14, 1950) was an American bobsledder who competed in the early 1930s.

He was born in New York City and died in Sacramento.

At the 1932 Winter Olympics in Lake Placid he won the silver medal in the four-man event.

A civil engineer by profession, Homburger was also responsible for the design of the bobsleigh track used for those Winter Olympics; he also did engineer work for Saranac Lake architect William G. Distin in the design of the Olympic Arena in Lake Placid.

References

External links
Bobsleigh four-man Olympic medalists for 1924, 1932-56, and since 1964
DatabaseOlympics.com profile
History of bobsleigh featuring Homburger
Wallenchinsky, David. (1984). "Bobsled: Four-Man". In The Complete Book the Olympics: 1896-1980. New York: Penguin Books. p. 560.

1902 births
1950 deaths
American male bobsledders
American civil engineers
Bobsledders at the 1932 Winter Olympics
Sportspeople from New York City
Medalists at the 1932 Winter Olympics
Olympic silver medalists for the United States in bobsleigh
Engineers from New York City
20th-century American engineers